Joanna Bourke,  (born 1963) is a British historian and academic. She is professor of history at Birkbeck, University of London.

Biography
Born to Christian medical-missionary parents, Bourke was brought up in New Zealand, Zambia, Solomon Islands and Haiti. She attended the University of Auckland, gaining a Bachelor of Arts and Master of Arts in History. She undertook her Doctor of Philosophy degree at the Australian National University (ANU) and subsequently held academic posts at the ANU, Emmanuel College, Cambridge and Birkbeck, University of London. Her primary affiliation is with Birkbeck, University of London, but she is also Professor of Rhetoric at Gresham College, London, and the Global Innovation Chair in the Centre for the Study of Violence at the University of Newcastle, Australia. She has joint British and New Zealand citizenship.

Bourke, who describes herself as a "socialist feminist", has published 13 books and over 100 articles in academic journals or edited collections. Her books include ones on British, Irish, American, Australia, and Haitian history from the late eighteenth century to the present. They focus on topics such as women's history, gender, working-class culture, war and masculinity, the cultural history of fear, the history of rape, war art, pain, militarisation, the history of what it means to be human,  and animal-human relations. Her books have been translated into Chinese, Russian, Spanish, Catalan, Italian, Portuguese, Czech, Turkish, and Greek. An Intimate History of Killing won the Wolfson Prize and the Fraenkel Prize. It was in the final shortlist for the W. H. Smith Literary Prize.

Bourke is frequent contributor to television and radio, a blogger and tweeter, and a regular correspondent for newspapers and popular journals. Her 40-CD audio history of Britain, entitled "Eyewitness", won Gold for Best Audio Production for Volume 1910–19, Gold for Best Audio Production for Volume 1940–49, and Gold for the Most Original Audio for all 10 volumes.

Bourke lives in London. In 2014, she was elected a Fellow of the British Academy, the United Kingdom's national academy for the humanities and social sciences. She is the Principal Investigator for a Wellcome Trust project called SHaME, or Sexual Harms and Medical Encounters, which explores the medical and psychiatric aspects of sexual violence. The project aims to move beyond shame to address this global health crisis. SHaME is an interdisciplinary research project, with PhD scholars, post-doctoral researchers, a film-maker, visiting fellows and professors, and a public engagement and events organiser. SHaME spans both historical and contemporary, regional and global perspectives. It is committed to research and activism involving minoritised communities. As part of this project Bourke is writing one book on the medical and psychiatric aspects of sexual violence in the United Kingdom, United States, Ireland, and Australasia (to be published by Oxford University Press), followed by another on the global history of sexual violence.

Selected works
Husbandry and Housewifery: Women, Economic Change and Housework in Ireland, 1890–1914, Oxford University Press, 1993. 
Working-Class Cultures in Britain, 1890–1960: Gender, Class and Ethnicity, Routledge, 1994. 
Dismembering the Male: Men's Bodies, Britain and the Great War, Reaktion Press and University of Chicago Press, 1996. 
An Intimate History of Killing: Face-to-Face Killing in Twentieth Century Warfare,  Granta, 1999, (Won the Fraenkel Prize in Contemporary History for 1998 and the Wolfson Prize for Historical Writing in 2000)  
 Eyewitness, Authentic Voices of the 20th Century, BBC Audiobooks, 2004
Fear: A Cultural History, Virago, 2006 (published by Shoemaker and Hoard in the US; shortlisted for Mind Book of the Year Award 2006 (UK)) 
Rape: A History from the 1860s to the Present, Virago, 2007 (published in the US as Rape: Sex, Violence, History, Shoemaker & Hoard, 2007)
What It Means To Be Human. Historical Reflections 1790 to the Present, Virago, 2011 (published by Counterpoint in the US)
The Story of Pain: From Prayer to Painkillers, Oxford University Press, 2014. 
Wounding the World: How Military Violence and War-Play Invade our Lives, Virago, 2014 (published in the US as Deep Violence: Military Violence, War Play, and the Social Life of Weapons, Counterpoint, 2015) 
 War and Art: A Visual History of Modern Conflict, Reaktion Books, 2017 
 Loving Animals: On Bestiality, Zoophilia and Post-Human Love, TJ Books, 2020, 
 Birkbeck: 200 Years of Radical Learning for Working People, Oxford University Press, 2022.

References

External links

1963 births
Living people
Academics of Birkbeck, University of London
Australian National University alumni
Academic staff of the Australian National University
British historians
Fellows of Emmanuel College, Cambridge
New Zealand expatriates in England
University of Auckland alumni
Fellows of the British Academy
British women historians